Beating Dead Horses is the seventh studio album by American industrial rock band 16volt, released on May 5, 2011 by Metropolis Records.

Reception
Brutal Resonance commended the production quality and composition variety of Beating Dead Horses, saying "there are some tracks on this album that vary but most of the tracks follow the same line and it's a pretty straight forward album." COMA Music Magazine called the album the band's best work and said "fans are sure to find Beating Dead Horses to be very enjoyable while new listeners should appreciate the dynamic soundscapes offered by 16Volt." ReGen commended the band for remaining successful composers through their existence and said "with Beating Dead Horses presenting a leaner, meaner, more stripped down and more amped up 16volt, the band stands tall at the forefront of machine rock." Soundsphere Magazine gave the album four out of five stars and said "utilising a blend of the classic band set-up (guitar, drums, vocal and bass) alongside electronic gear (synthesizers, samplers, drum machines and more), this band has come to perfect the skill of mixing of these different sounds that give us the songs we know and love."

Track listing

Personnel
Adapted from the Beating Dead Horses liner notes.

16volt
 Mike Peoples – bass guitar, guitars
 Eric Powell – lead vocals, guitars, programming, keyboards, production, recording, design

Additional performers
 Clint Carney – additional programming (3, 9, 13)
 Bill Sarver – additional programming (4, 8, 9, 13)

Production and design
 Josh Asselstine – engineering
 Pyra Draculea – assistant engineering
 Ryan Foster – mastering
 Shaun Thingvold – mixing

Release history

References

External links 
 
 Beating Dead Horses at Bandcamp
 

2011 albums
16volt albums
Metropolis Records albums